Ayas Nautical research club was founded in 1985. The range of its activities is quite wide, including historical aspects of World and Armenian navigation and shipbuilding, reconstruction of ancient Armenian vessels, study of sea routes, old maps, navigation devices, banners, collecting data on Armenian navigators, making underwater archaeological surveys and research. Since 1985 the Club has organized 15 exhibitions and has carried out several surveys on Armenian navigation. 26 different types of vessels (rafts, leather boats, log-boats, boats and ships) used in historical Armenia, were restored and reconstructed. Members of the Club permanently participate in international conferences on underwater archaeology and nautical history and have published a number of articles.

Medieval sailing ship replica reconstruction and test (1985-2003)
The Ayas Nautical Research Club has built a replica of a 13th-century merchant sailing ship of the Armenian Kingdom of Cilicia. The ship was reconstructed in strict accordance with the information found in medieval manuscripts and miniatures, using the techniques and technologies available in the 13th century. The ship of 20 metres in length and displacing 50 tonnes was tested in 2002-2003 on Lake Sevan in Armenia.

Expedition around Europe (2004-2006)
The Cilicia is a functioning replica of a 13th-century merchant sailing ship of the Armenian Kingdom of Cilicia. It has sailed the medieval sea trade routes around Europe, via the Black and Mediterranean Seas, the Atlantic Ocean, the North and Baltic Seas, the rivers of Russia and finishing on the Black Sea, passing more than 15,000 nautical miles, visiting 63 ports in 25 countries of Europe and Asia.
This is the first time in the history of navigation, that a vessel has closed a full ring around Europe by water.
The travel was equipped with accessories typical of the 13th century (navigation tools, merchandise goods, food, clothes, etc.) replicating the methods of navigation and the lifestyle of medieval sailors. The main goal of the experiment was to feel and to check how medieval sailors had sailed and operated with such vessels. Common responsibility to safeguard historical and cultural heritage was the objective. The Expedition highlighted the significant role of travelers and merchants in establishing connections between cultures and civilizations separated by seas, and the ship as the symbol and means of unification.

Expedition to the Caribbean (2007-2008) (jointly with the ANAHIT association)
In 1698 the well known pirate William Kidd had captured an Armenian merchant ship Quedagh Merchant in the Indian Ocean. He changed the name of the ship and sailed it to the Caribbean. In 1699 the ship was abandoned near the coast of the Dominican Republic.
We have sailed by sailing yacht “Anahit” (ketch under Armenian flag), from Annapolis, Chesapeake bay, to the Caribbean (Dominican Rep.).
We have found the remains of the vessel (guns) and investigated in site the shipwreck area.
Kidd took his most valuable prize, the Armenian ship Quedagh Merchant, in January 1698 and scuttled his own unseaworthy Adventure Galley. When he reached Anguilla, in the West Indies (April 1699), he learned that he had been denounced as a pirate. He left the Quedagh Merchant  at Catalina Island, Dominican Republic  (where the ship was possibly scuttled).

Traditional Sevanian sailing boats reconstruction (on-going project, 2008 - )

Ayas Nautical Research Club has restored the old Sevanian sailboat. There are plans to build 10 boats and organize an annual international regatta of the traditional sailing fishing boats of Lake Sevan. Two of them were sailed and tested in summer 2009. It is hoped that the development of such sailing as a sport will bring attention to the problems of the ecology of Lake Sevan.

Establish Maritime Museum in Yerevan, Armenia (on-going project)

External links
 Ayas – The official website of Ayas Nautical Research Club

Naval history
Historical societies of Armenia